John Thompson, has been the  Roger M Bale Professor of Entrepreneurship at the University of Huddersfield in West Yorkshire, United Kingdom, since 1997. In 2009, he was awarded the Queen's Award for Enterprise Promotion.

References

Queen's Award for Enterprise Promotion (2009)
British businesspeople
Living people
Year of birth missing (living people)